Freight from Baltimore is a 1938 German drama film directed by Hans Hinrich and starring Hilde Weissner, Attila Hörbiger, and Hans Zesch-Ballot. Interiors were shot at the Tempelhof Studios in Berlin. The film's sets were designed by the art directors  and Erich Czerwonski. It was partly shot on location at the Port of Hamburg.

Cast

References

Bibliography 
 Klaus, Ulrich J. Deutsche Tonfilme: Jahrgang 1938. Klaus-Archiv, 1988.

External links 
 

1938 films
Films of Nazi Germany
German drama films
1938 drama films
1930s German-language films
Films directed by Hans Hinrich
Terra Film films
Films shot in Hamburg
Seafaring films
German black-and-white films
1930s German films
Films shot at Tempelhof Studios